Samir Bertin d'Avesnes (born 15 April 1986) is a Comorian professional footballer who played as a forward.

Club career 
D'Avesnes was born in Moroni. He played for Ligue 2 club SC Bastia from 2002 to 2008. However, in August 2008, he resiliated his contract with SC Bastia and signed to Croix-de-Savoie. After one year with Savoie, signed in summer 2009 for AS Beauvais Oise.

International career 
D'Avesnes has played for the France U18 national team. He earned one cap for the Comoros senior national team.

References 

1986 births
Living people
French sportspeople of Comorian descent
Comorian footballers
French footballers
Association football forwards
Comoros international footballers
France youth international footballers
Ligue 1 players
Ligue 2 players
SC Bastia players
AS Beauvais Oise players
Thonon Evian Grand Genève F.C. players
US Roye-Noyon players